The Edifying and Joyous Story of Colinot is a 1973 French comedy film directed and written by Nina Companéez. Francis Huster stars as the title character, Colinot. It is notable as the final film appearance of Brigitte Bardot who retired from the entertainment industry when the film went into post-production.

Plot
Colinot's (Huster) world is turned upside down when his fiancee is kidnapped. This leads him to dangerous chase around 15th century France only to find that she has found love in the arms of a nobleman. But his fortunes take a turn when he meets Arabelle (Bardot) who teaches him many life lessons.

Cast
Francis Huster as Colinot
Brigitte Bardot as Arabelle
Nathalie Delon as Bertrade
Ottavia Piccolo as Bergamotte
Francis Blanche as vagrant
Bernadette Lafont as Rosemonde
Alice Sapritch as Dame Blanche
Muriel Catala as Blandine
Jean-Claude Drouot as Masnil Plassac
Julien Guiomar as Rosemonde's husband
Jean Le Poulain as Brother Albaret
Paul Müller as Brother Hugo
Rufus as Gagnepain
Henri Tisot as Tournebeuf
Évelyne Buyle as The paid companion
Guy Grosso as Lucas
Catherine Lachens
Marie-Georges Pascal
Maurice Barrier
Mike Marshall

References

External links
 

1973 films
1970s French-language films
1973 comedy films
Films directed by Nina Companéez
Films set in the 15th century
1970s historical comedy films
French historical comedy films
1970s French films